Grace H. Murray (9 November 1872 – 1944) was an American watercolor painter. Murray studied under William Bouguereau at the Académie Julian in Paris.

Her work is included in the collections of the Smithsonian American Art Museum and the Brooklyn Museum.

References

1872 births
1944 deaths
19th-century American women artists
20th-century American women artists
Académie Julian alumni 
Artists from New York City